Standard of living is the level of income, comforts and services available, generally applied to a society or location, rather than to an individual. Standard of living is relevant because it is considered to contribute to an individual's quality of life. Standard of living is generally concerned with objective metrics outside an individual's personal control, such as economic, societal, political and environmental matters – such things that an individual might consider when evaluating where to live in the world, or when assessing the success of economic policy. 

In international law, an "adequate standard of living" was first described in the Universal Declaration of Human Rights and further described in the International Covenant on Economic, Social and Cultural Rights. To evaluate the impact of policy for sustainable development, different disciplines have defined Decent Living Standards in order to evaluate or compare relative living experience. 

During much of its use in economics, improvements to standard of living was thought to be directly connected to economic growth, increase amount of energy consumption and other materials. However, the IPCC Sixth Assessment Report found that literature demonstrates that improvements in sustainable development practices as well as changes in technological efficiency and energy production and use, allow for a Decent Living Standard for all people without fossil fuels and ~15.3 GJ per capita by the end of the 21st century. This allows for climate change mitigation by demand reduction as well as other sustainable development practices.

Factors considered by scholars 
Standard of living might be evaluated using a number of characteristics including as the quality and availability of employment, class disparity, poverty rate, quality and housing affordability, hours of work required to purchase necessities, gross domestic product, inflation rate, amount of leisure time, access to and quality of healthcare, quality and availability of education, literacy rates, life expectancy, occurrence of diseases, cost of goods and services, infrastructure, access to, quality and affordability of public transportation, national economic growth, economic and political stability, freedom, environmental quality, climate and safety. For the purposes of economics, politics and policy, it is usually compared across time or between groups defined by social, economic or geographical parameters.

Right to an adequate standard of living

Decent Living Standard 

The standard of living varies between individuals depending on different aspects of life. The standard of living consists of the individuals having the basics such as food, shelter, social safety and interaction which all contribute to their wellbeing and what is considered to be a decent living standard. 

Experts use a number of different measures and approaches to establish the decent living standard or DLS. The decent living standard revolves around the idea and principle that a majority of the population are in demand for the basics that will allow them to have shelter, food and water, however it is not always able to be maintained for a long period of time.

Measurement 
Standard of living is generally measured by standards such as inflation-adjusted income per person and poverty rate. Other measures such as access and quality of health care, income growth inequality, and educational standards are also used. Examples are access to certain goods (such as the number of refrigerators per 1000 people), or measurement of health such as life expectancy. It is the ease by which people living in a time or place are able to satisfy their needs and/or wants.

There is also the biological standard of living, which pertains to how well the human biological organism fares in its socio-economic environment. It is often measured by the height of a population.

The idea of a 'standard' may be contrasted with the quality of life, which takes into account not only the material standard of living but also other more intangible aspects that make up human life, such as leisure, safety, cultural resources, social life, physical health, environmental quality issues.

See also 
 Gini coefficient
 Human Development Index
 Income and fertility
 Index of Economic Freedom
 List of countries by Social Progress Index
 Measurable economic welfare
 Median household income
 Quality of life
 Right to an adequate standard of living
 Total fertility rate
 Where-to-be-born Index
 Working hours

References

External links

 Industrial Revolution and the Standard of Living by Freddy Madero
 Commission on Living Standards 

 
Purchasing power